Montecrestese is a comune (municipality) in the Province of Verbano-Cusio-Ossola in the Italian region Piedmont, located about  northeast of Turin and about  northwest of Verbania, on the border with Switzerland.

Montecrestese borders the following municipalities: Campo (Vallemaggia) (Switzerland), Crevoladossola, Crodo, Masera, Premia, Santa Maria Maggiore.

Demographic evolution

References

Cities and towns in Piedmont